Plain Jane is an American reality television series that transforms one woman each week. The series debuted on July 28, 2010, on The CW. Despite the series not being renewed by its original network, Sony Pictures Television worked with MTV to produce a second season. An 8-episode second season was greenlit and aired in October 2011.

It was announced in May 2013 that the Style Network would be airing the second season starting on June 3, 2013, but the series has since been removed from the schedule.
The series was renewed for a third season of 12 episodes, which aired in 2014.

Format
Each week, British fashion expert Louise Roe, acting like a "fairy godmother", takes one 'Plain Jane' and transforms her inside and out with confidence-building challenges and a head-to-toe makeover. It culminates when she reveals her secret crush to the person of her dreams on a romantic date.

Episodes

Season 1 (2010)
The first season of Plain Jane included 6 one-hour episodes. It premiered on July 28, 2010 and finished its first season on September 1, 2010.

Season 2 (2011)
Season 2 premiered on MTV UK on October 19, 2011.

References

2010s American reality television series
2010 American television series debuts
2011 American television series endings
MTV original programming
The CW original programming
Television series by Sony Pictures Television